Nawazuddin Siddiqui (born 19 May 1974) is an Indian actor known for his work in Hindi cinema. He is best known for his roles in The Lunchbox (2013), Manto (2018), and Raman Raghav 2.0. As many as eight films in which he features have been screened at the Cannes Film Festival.

Early life
Siddiqui was born on 19 May 1974 in Budhana, a small town in Muzaffarnagar district, Uttar Pradesh, India, into a zamindari Muslim family of Lambardars. He is the eldest of eight siblings. He spent most of his youth in Uttarakhand.

He graduated with a Bachelor of Science in chemistry from Gurukul Kangri Vishwavidyalaya, Haridwar. Following this, he worked as a chemist in Vadodara for a year, before leaving for Delhi in search of a new job. Once in Delhi, he was instantly drawn to acting after watching a play. In pursuit of securing admission to the National School of Drama (NSD) in New Delhi, he acted in over ten plays with a group of friends, including one in Dehradun, to fulfill one of the criteria for admission.

He is an alumnus of the National School of Drama. Siddiqui's feature film debut was alongside director Prashant Bhargava in Patang (2012). He gained international recognition for his work in Black Friday (2007), Kahaani (2011), the 2012 Gangs of Wasseypur duology, and Raman Raghav 2.0 (2016). The actor has won several awards, including a National Film Award, an IIFA Award, and two Filmfare Awards, as well as a nomination for an International Emmy. He has starred in two Emmy-nominated series, Sacred Games (2019) and the British McMafia.

Career
Siddiqui went to the National School of Drama in New Delhi. After graduating in 1999, he moved to Mumbai.

He made his Bollywood debut in the year 1999 with a small role in the Aamir Khan starrer Sarfarosh. He then appeared in Ram Gopal Varma's 1999 film Shool and the 2000 film Jungle, as well as Rajkumar Hirani's Munnabhai MBBS (2003). After moving to Mumbai, he tried to get work in television serials but did not achieve much success. He did a short film, The Bypass, in 2003, where he appeared with Irrfan Khan. Beyond that, between 2002 and 2005, he was largely out of work and lived in a flat that he shared with four other people, surviving by conducting occasional acting workshops. In 2004, which was one of the worst years of his struggle, Siddiqui couldn't pay rent. He asked an NSD senior if he could stay with him. The senior allowed him to share his apartment in Goregaon suburb if he was willing to cook meals for him.

Between 2004 and 2007, Siddiqui had a few minor roles, including in the film Black Friday, which came out in 2007 and was a nominee for the Golden Leopard. In 2009, he appeared in a cameo role in the song "Emotional Atyachar" in the movie Dev D, playing the role of Rangila. He performed a duet with Rasila (known together as Patna ke Presley). In the same year, he appeared in New York. However, it was his role of a journalist in Anusha Rizvi's 2010 film Peepli Live, that first got him wide recognition as an actor. In 2012, he appeared in Prashant Bhargava's Patang: The Kite, which premiered at the Berlin International Film Festival and the Tribeca Film Festival. Siddiqui's performance was praised by film critic Roger Ebert, who stated that the role "transformed his acting style" and he awarded the actor the 'Thumbsup Trophy'. The film was subsequently released in the U.S. and Canada and garnered much attention, with rave reviews from The New York Times.

Siddiqui then appeared in the 2012 film Kahaani, in which he played the archetypal short-tempered intelligence officer Khan. Anurag Kashyap's gangster epic Gangs of Wasseypur followed, which furthered the actor's fame. He played his first primary role as Sonu Duggal in Ashim Ahluwalia's Miss Lovely, which premiered at the 2012 Cannes Film Festival, a role Siddiqui describes as his "most real performance so far". Siddiqui then followed this with the sequel to Gangs of Wasseypur. In 2013, he played the lead role in the horror flick Aatma. The Lunchbox premiered as part of the International Critics' Week at the 2013 Cannes Film Festival and won him multiple awards. He appeared in Aamir Khan's 2012 release Talaash. He received the Special Jury Award at the 2012 National Film Awards and the Filmfare Award for Best Supporting Actor in 2013 for The Lunchbox. In 2014, he played the lead antagonist Shiv Gajra in the blockbuster Kick.

In 2015, Siddiqui's films Bajrangi Bhaijaan and Manjhi – The Mountain Man were released, and he was praised for his roles. His work in Raman Raghav 2.0 in 2016 won him the Fancine Malaga Award in Spain and in the Asia Pacific Screen Awards, both in the category of Best Actor. The 2018 film Manto was a groundbreaking performance that won him Best Actor at the 2018 Asia Pacific Screen Awards.

Celebrated author Paulo Coelho has recommended Sacred Games to his Twitter followers and lauded Nawazuddin's work, calling it "One of the best series on Netflix with the great actor Nawazuddin".

In 2021, he was seen in the American-Bangladeshi-Indian film No Land's Man.

In 2022, Siddiqui will appear in Jogira Sara Ra Ra and Heropanti 2. In the same year, he is also set to star in Kangana Ranaut's Tiku Weds Sheru, opposite Avneet Kaur.

Personal life
Siddiqui has been married twice. As a teenager and young adult, he was in a stormy relationship with a Hindu Brahmin woman, Anjana Kishor Pandey, who also grew up in Budhana, Uttar Pradesh. After moving to Mumbai, Siddiqui invited her to move in with him, and the couple had a prolonged but strained live-in relationship that ended in 2010. Siddiqui then married a woman named Sheeba, a marriage that did not last long, and the couple divorced in 2012. Already by this time, Siddiqui was dating a woman from New Jersey named Suzanne, and then he had a brief relationship with Niharika Singh, a starlet who acted with him in a TV serial. 

Siddiqui later reconnected with Pandey, and after she converted to Islam and changed her first name to Aalia, they married and had two children, a daughter and a son. The marriage soon went downhill, however, and in May 2020, Aalia Siddiqui announced on social media that she was seeking a divorce.

Siddiqui lives in Mumbai with his younger brother, Shamas Nawab, an aspiring film director. When not busy acting, he likes to spend time in his hometown of Budhana, where he owns a farm. In a May 2021 interview, he revealed that he now spends the major part of his time there.

Filmography

Accolades
Siddiqui's first lead role in a feature film was in Prashant Bhargava's Patang, which premiered at the Berlin Film Festival, in which his performance has been praised by noted film critic Roger Ebert (awarding the film 4/4 stars), who stated that the role "transformed his acting style".

Siddiqui was awarded the Special Jury Award at the 60th National Film Awards 2012 for his work in the films Kahaani, Gangs of Wasseypur, Dekh Indian Circus, and Talaash.

Major associations

Film festival awards

Other awards

References

External links

 
 
 

1974 births
Living people
21st-century Indian male actors
Male actors from Uttar Pradesh
People from Muzaffarnagar district
Male actors in Hindi cinema
Indian male stage actors
Gurukul Kangri University alumni
National School of Drama alumni
Bharatendu Academy of Dramatic Arts alumni
20th-century Indian male actors
Special Jury Award (feature film) National Film Award winners
Best Supporting Actor Asian Film Award winners
Filmfare Awards winners
Screen Awards winners
International Indian Film Academy Awards winners
Asia Pacific Screen Award winners